ICIS may refer to:
 ICIS Pricing (Independent Commodity Intelligence Services), a business unit of LexisNexis
 Institutional Computing and Information Services
 International Congress of Infant Studies
 International Conference on Information Systems
 International Construction Information Society
 International Cytokine and Interferon Society
 Internal Counter-Intelligence Service, a fictional organization in the Doctor Who universe.
 Integrated Cadastral Information Society
 International Crop Information System